Baliochila lipara, the Lipara buff, is a butterfly of the family Lycaenidae. It is found in Malawi and from Zimbabwe to the coast of eastern Kenya. It has recently been discovered in the Manguzi and Temble areas of KwaZulu-Natal, South Africa. The habitat consists of deciduous woodland and savanna at altitudes ranging from 500 to 1,000 metres.

The larvae feed on algae (cyanobacteria) growing on trees.

References

Butterflies described in 1953
Poritiinae